All Sons & Daughters was an American Christian worship music duo, who performed in the styles of acoustic and folk music, originating from Franklin, Tennessee. The group's leads were Leslie Anne Jordan on vocals and guitar and David Alan Leonard on vocals and piano. They are worship leaders at Journey Church in Franklin, which is a non-denominational church. They have four full-length, commercial album releases, all on the Integrity Music label: Season One, Live, All Sons & Daughters and Poets & Saints. On February 9, 2018, after taking a year off they announced that their "season as a band has come to an end".

Background
All Sons & Daughters formed in 2009, signing with their label Integrity in October 2010. They released three EPs, which were Brokenness Aside: EP No. 1, Prone To Wander: A Collection of Hymns EP and Reason To Sing: EP No. 2 that charted at No. 12 on Christian Albums chart and No. 5 on Heatseekers Albums chart, before their first full-length studio album called Season One. The album was released on March 13, 2012. Their second album, Live, was released April 23, 2013.

David Alan Leonard, formerly a member of Jackson Waters, decided he wanted deeper and more authentic connection with a planted body of believers. Leslie Anne Jordan had grown up in worship leading settings since high school, where she wrestled with a calling into a full career of ministry. The two were equally devoted to recording music that was authentic and raw. They joined together to write songs that have been called "unpolished" due to the unedited nature of their music. Both Leslie and David wanted to remain connected to the church body they shared. They have continued to lead worship at their non-denominational church in Franklin, Tennessee, while also recording music and touring the country in concert.

Members 
Leslie Anne Jordan
David Alan Leonard

Discography

Albums

References

External links
 New Release Today profile

Musical groups established in 2009
American musical duos
Musical groups from Tennessee